Joseph Leonard Bonamassa (born May 8, 1977) is an American blues rock guitarist, singer and songwriter. He started his career at age twelve, when he opened for B.B. King. Since 2000, Bonamassa has released fifteen solo albums through his independent record label J&R Adventures, of which eleven have reached No. 1 on the Billboard Blues chart.

Bonamassa has played alongside many notable blues and rock artists, and has earned three Grammy Awards nominations. Among guitarists, he is known for his extensive collection of vintage guitars and amplifiers.

In 2020, Bonamassa created Keeping the Blues Alive Records, an independent record label that promotes and supports the talent of blues musicians. Current artists include Dion DiMucci, Joanne Shaw Taylor, Joanna Connor, Larry McCray and others. Bonamassa produces and collaborates on many of the projects.

Early life 
Bonamassa was born in New Hartford, New York, and grew up in Utica, New York. He started playing guitar at age four, encouraged by his father, who was an avid music fan and exposed him to British blues rock records by Eric Clapton and Jeff Beck, greatly inspiring him. At eleven years old, Bonamassa was mentored and trained by American guitar legend Danny Gatton. When he was twelve years old, he had his own band called Smokin' Joe Bonamassa, which gigged around western New York and Pennsylvania, including cities such as Scranton and Buffalo, only on weekends since he had school on weekdays. Bonamassa played a crimson 1972 Fender Stratocaster he called "Rosie", given to him by his father.

Bonamassa opened for B.B. King at approximately twenty shows in 1989.  Before he reached eighteen years old, Bonamassa was playing in a band called Bloodline with the sons of Miles Davis, Robby Krieger and Berry Oakley. Although Bloodline did not become a famous act, it attracted some attention to Bonamassa's guitar chops.

Music career

2000–2019 
Bonamassa's debut studio album, A New Day Yesterday, was released in 2000. It features original tunes and covers of artists such as: Rory Gallagher, Jethro Tull and Warren Haynes. The album features a guest appearance by Gregg Allman on the song "If Heartaches Were Nickels", and was produced by Tom Dowd. The album reached No. 9 on the Billboard Blues chart.

Between 2002 and 2006, Bonamassa had three studio albums hit No. 1 on the Billboard Blues charts, and all five of his solo studio albums made the Top 10. In 2009, Bonamassa fulfilled one of his childhood dreams by playing at the Royal Albert Hall in London, where Eric Clapton played a duet with him. Bonamassa's live album, Beacon Theatre: Live from New York, was released in 2012. The show featured one of Bonamassa's musical heroes, Paul Rodgers (formerly of the bands Free and Bad Company), as a guest.

The live acoustic album, An Acoustic Evening at the Vienna Opera House, was released as a CD/DVD/Blu-ray set on March 26, 2013. This concert marked the first time Bonamassa played a wholly acoustic show. The acoustic ensemble that performed the show was assembled with the help of Bonamassa's longtime producer, Kevin Shirley. The concluding, three-night stand of Bonamassa's spring 2013 tour, occurred at the famous Beacon Theatre in New York City. Over the summer of 2013, Bonamassa performed four shows in London featuring three different bands (and a horn section at one show), covering four different sides of his music. Each show had a unique set list. The shows were recorded for a DVD release, and the set of DVDs was released in October 2013 as "Tour de Force".

Bonamassa's album, Different Shades of Blue, is his first solo studio album since So, It's Like That to showcase only original songs (with the exception of a brief instrumental Jimi Hendrix cover). Bonamassa wrote the album in Nashville with three songwriters: Jonathan Cain of Journey, James House (known for his work with Diamond Rio), Dwight Yoakam, Martina McBride and Jerry Flowers (who has written for Keith Urban). Bonamassa sought to create serious blues rock in the project, instead of three-minute radio hits. The album was recorded at a music studio in the Palms Hotel in Las Vegas. The album charted at No. 8 on the Billboard 200, No. 1 on the blues chart, and No. 1 on the indie chart.

In May 2015, Bonamassa won a Blues Music Award in the Instrumentalist – Guitar category. In April 2018, Bonamassa's signature amplifier, the ‘59 Twin-Amp JB Edition, was released by Fender. On June 27, 2018, Bonamassa premiered at the Grand Ole Opry. He made a guest appearance after being introduced by Chase Bryant, and playing along with him in his final song of the set, "I Need a Cold Beer".

2020–present 
Bonamassa released the live album and film, Now Serving: Royal Tea Live from the Ryman, on June 11, 2021. It was from his one-night-only concert, at the historic Ryman Auditorium in Nashville, Tennessee on September 20, 2020. The show was live-streamed at the time, and raised $32,000 for Bonamassa's Fueling Musicians program, which has been helping financially struggling musicians during the COVID-19 pandemic.

Collaborations with Beth Hart 
Bonamassa was first exposed to Beth Hart's music after seeing her play several television performances. The two would often cross paths when playing shows separately in Europe, and Bonamassa became very impressed with Hart when he caught her show at the Blue Balls Festival in Lucerne, Switzerland. While recording his album, Dust Bowl (and listening to the expanded edition of the Rolling Stones' Get Yer Ya-Ya's Out! which features tracks by Ike & Tina Turner), Bonamassa became inspired to try pairing up with a woman. Hart came to mind, and the two musicians met up in a hotel bar in Dublin. Bonamassa floated the idea, which Hart accepted immediately, although she was at first under the impression that he was asking her to sing backup vocals on his next album. When she realized that his intention was for her to sing lead vocals, she said "I was floored".

Bonamassa, Hart and producer Kevin Shirley wrote down lists of soul songs they liked to come up with material for the album, which was named Don't Explain. The group settled on twelve songs, although only ten ended up being recorded. Bonamassa and Hart each chose five songs for the album. Some of Hart's favorite tracks on the album included, "For My Friend" by Bill Withers, and "Sinner's Prayer" by Ray Charles. Bonamassa had wanted to do versions of Brook Benton's "I'll Take Care of You", and "Well Well" written by Delaney Bramlett & Bonnie Bramlett.

Their follow-up album, Seesaw, was nominated for a Grammy in the category of Best Blues Album in 2013. Hart and Bonamassa released, Black Coffee, on January 26, 2018. It was produced by Kevin Shirley.

Additional projects 
Bonamassa is a member of the jazz-funk band Rock Candy Funk Party. In 2013, they released their debut album, We Want Groove. It was followed by Rock Candy Funk Party Takes New York – Live at the Iridium. The show was recorded over three nights, at the Iridium Jazz Club in New York City. The band played during Conan on February 10, 2014.

Bonamassa produced podcasts with another guitar aficionado, Matt Abramovitz, between January and July 2015. The Pickup Radio episodes are about "the life and lore of the guitar". Bonamassa and Abramovitz discuss their favorite guitars, guitarists and occasionally non-guitarists associated with the blues and rock genres. 

Bonamassa also serves as the guitarist and secondary lead vocalist for the hard rock supergroup Black Country Communion. In September 2017, the band released their fourth studio album, BCCIV.

In August 2021, Bonamassa appeared as a contestant on To Tell the Truth.

Bonamassa played lead guitar on two tracks from the 2022 album, From The New World, by Alan Parsons.

Guitar and amplifier collection 

Bonamassa is known for his extensive collection of vintage amplifiers and guitars. He started collecting at an early age. His parents owned a music shop in upstate New York, which is now called Bonamassa Guitars. His first vintage guitar was a 1963 Stratocaster. He bought guitars compulsively for a while, including many he would never play, and then sold a lot of them to focus on guitars he could actually use. During an online interview in 2020, Bonamassa said that his favorite guitar is his 1951 Fender Telecaster, nicknamed "The Bludgeon" (which has been modified with a humbucking pickup in the neck position). In 2021, Fender and Bonamassa announced the release of a limited edition reproduction of "The Bludgeon", by Custom Shop Master Builder Greg Fessler. 

In 2014 he acquired a 1958 Gibson Flying V from Norman Harris of Norman's Rare Guitars. He named the guitar Amos after the original owner Amos Arthur. He plays the rare and valuable guitar in concerts. 

Bonamassa is a collector of Gibson Les Pauls, including nearly a dozen "bursts" (1958–1960 Gibson Les Paul Standard).  In 2021, Epiphone announced the release of a replica of his 1958 Gibson Les Paul Custom in black.

Additionally, Bonamassa has a collection of over 100 amplifiers, mostly vintage "tweed" Fender amps.

Bonamassa affectionately refers to the area of his home with vintage gear as the "Bona-seum". "Joe Bonamassa has been playing, buying and collecting vintage guitars and amps for most of his life. ...he has a vast collection, enough to create his own museum of rare and vintage gear: the Bona-seum."

In a 2019 Guitar World interview, Bonamassa stated that he has more than 400 guitars and 400 amplifiers.

Influences 

Unlike many blues rock guitarists that came before him, Bonamassa's influences are British and Irish blues acts, rather than American artists. In an interview in Guitarist magazine, he cited three albums that had the biggest influence on his playing: The Beano Album by John Mayall & the Bluesbreakers with Eric Clapton, Rory Gallagher's Irish Tour '74 and Goodbye by Cream. He also noted that Stevie Ray Vaughan's, Texas Flood, had a big influence when Bonamassa was young. Among other bands, he listed the early blues playing of Jethro Tull as an influence, and named both Martin Barre and Mick Abrahams as important musicians to him.

He elaborated on his influences:

In an October 2008 interview with Express & Star, he said:

In a December 2012 interview with MusicRadar:

Keeping the Blues Alive Records 
In June 2020, Dion released Blues with Friends via Keeping the Blues Alive Records (KTBA), a new record label created by Bonamassa and Roy Weisman for Dion and other blues musicians to showcase their talents. The album features Van Morrison, Jeff Beck, Paul Simon, Bruce Springsteen, and others (including liner notes by Bob Dylan). The album reached No. 1 on the Billboard Blues Albums chart (9 weeks at No. 1 and 59 weeks total), and No. 4 on iTunes. It also charted in United Kingdom, Germany, France, Italy, Canada and Australia.

Dion also released "You Know It's Christmas" (featuring Bonamassa and co-written with Mike Aquilina) in 2020. Dion produced a music video for all songs, releasing them on his website and social media platforms, such as Facebook and YouTube.

Dion's song "Blues Comin' On" (with Bonamassa) from Blues with Friends was nominated for a 2021 Blues Music Award. The album was also awarded Favorite Blues Album.

Joanne Shaw Taylor released the charting single "If That Ain't a Reason" from the No. 1 The Blues Album (2021), and Joanna Connor released the No. 1 blues album 4801 South Indiana Avenue (2021) on the label.

Dion released Stomping Ground in November 2021, along with music videos. Except for a cover of "Red House", the songs were written by Dion and Aquilina. Multiple guest artists participated on the album, including Springsteen and Patti Scialfa on "Angels in the Alleyways", with extensive liner notes written by Pete Townshend. It became Dion's second No. 1 album on the Billboard blues chart.

Larry McCray (album Blues Without You) and Robert Jon & the Wreck (single "Waiting for Your Man") are also on the KTBA label, with music released by both in 2022.

In 2022, Joanne Shaw Taylor released Blues from the Heart: Live. The single and music video for "Can't You See What You're Doing to Me" features Kenny Wayne Shepherd. All projects were produced by Bonamassa.

Personal life 
On November 21, 2022, Bonamassa announced in a since-deleted post on Instagram that he would no longer post on social media, fearing that he would "be provoked one day into saying something I might regret."; he had replied to a trolling post in a harsh manner a few days prior. He stated that future Instagram posts would not be made by him. By January 2, 2023, he had returned to Instagram and stated he would check back in periodically.

Awards and nominations

Discography 
 

Solo studio albums
 A New Day Yesterday (2000)
 So, It's Like That (2002)
 Blues Deluxe (2003)
 Had to Cry Today (2004)
 You & Me (2006)
 Sloe Gin (2007)
 The Ballad of John Henry (2009)
 Black Rock (2010)
 Dust Bowl (2011)
 Driving Towards the Daylight (2012)
 Different Shades of Blue (2014)
 Blues of Desperation (2016)
 Redemption (2018)
 Joe Bonamassa Christmas Comes But Once a Year (2019)
 Royal Tea (2020)
 Time Clocks (2021)

Solo live albums
 A New Day Yesterday Live (2002)
 Shepherd's Bush Empire (2007)
 Live from Nowhere in Particular (2008)
 Live from the Royal Albert Hall (2009)
 Beacon Theatre: Live from New York (2012)
 An Acoustic Evening at the Vienna Opera House (2013)
 Tour de Force: Live in London – The Borderline (2014)
 Tour de Force: Live in London – Shepherd's Bush Empire (2014)
 Tour de Force: Live in London – Hammersmith Apollo (2014)
 Tour de Force: Live in London – Royal Albert Hall (2014)
 Muddy Wolf at Red Rocks (2015)
 Live at Radio City Music Hall (2015)
 Live at the Greek Theatre (2016)
 Live at Carnegie Hall: An Acoustic Evening (2017)
 British Blues Explosion Live (2018)
 Live at the Sydney Opera House (2019)
 Now Serving: Royal Tea Live From The Ryman (2021)
 Tales of Time (2023)

With Black Country Communion
 Black Country Communion (2010)
 Black Country Communion 2 (2011)
 Live Over Europe (2012)
 Afterglow (2012)
 BCCIV (2017)

With Rock Candy Funk Party
 We Want Groove (2013)
 Rock Candy Funk Party Takes New York: Live at the Iridium (2014)
 Groove Is King (2015)
 The Groove Cubed (2017)

With Beth Hart
 Don't Explain (2011)
 Seesaw (2013)
 Live in Amsterdam (2014)
 Black Coffee (2018)

With Sleep Eazys
 Easy to Buy, Hard to Sell (2020)

References

External links 

 

1977 births
Living people
Musicians from Utica, New York
Lead guitarists
Slide guitarists
American blues guitarists
American male guitarists
American rock guitarists
American blues singers
American rock singers
Blues rock musicians
Child rock musicians
Electric blues musicians
Black Country Communion members
Epic Records artists
Singers from New York (state)
Resonator guitarists
People from New Hartford, New York
Guitarists from New York (state)
21st-century American male singers
21st-century American singers
21st-century American guitarists
Provogue Records artists